Continental Freemasonry, otherwise known as Liberal Freemasonry, Latin Freemasonry, and Adogmatic Freemasonry, includes the Masonic lodges, primarily on the European continent, that recognize the Grand Orient de France (GOdF) or belong to CLIPSAS, SIMPA, TRACIA, CIMAS, COMAM, CATENA, GLUA, or any of various other international organizations of Liberal, i.e., Continental Freemasonry. The larger number of Freemasons, most of whom live in the United States–where Regular Freemasonry holds a virtual monopoly–belong to Masonic lodges that recognize the United Grand Lodge of England and do not recognize Continental Freemasons, regarding them as "irregular".

Two branches of Freemasonry 
Freemasonry has two branches "not in mutual regular amity":
 the Anglo/American "Regular" tradition of jurisdictions, typified by the United Grand Lodge of England (UGLE), and the various Grand Lodges in the United States.
 the European "Continental" tradition of jurisdictions, typified by GOdF, with varying and shifting amity.

In Latin American countries, Continental Europe and much of Africa the GOdF-style or European Continental Freemasonry predominates, although those nations may also have smaller Grand Lodges and Grand Orients that are part of the “Regular” tradition.

History of the schism 
There are several reasons for the schism in Freemasonry, and why it persists. The first instance of derecognition occurred in the United States shortly after the American Civil War. In 1869, the Grand Orient de France (GOdF) recognized a Masonic group in Louisiana which was not recognized by the Grand Lodge of Louisiana (GLL).  This was seen by GLL as an invasion of its jurisdiction, and it withdrew its recognition of GOdF. At the request of GLL, several other American Grand Lodges also withdrew recognition. There is evidence that racial motivations may have played a part in this derecognition. The GOdF had recently passed a resolution stating that "neither color, race, nor religion should disqualify a man for initiation" and the Grand Lodge of Louisiana strictly excluded blacks and those of mixed race. The initial schism was not unanimous in the U.S.; many American Grand Lodges continued to recognize the GOdF well into the  century.

1877 schism 
The schism widened in 1877 when the GOdF changed its constitutions to allow for complete religious "laïcité". While the Anglo-American tradition had long required candidates to acknowledge a belief in deity, the GOdF removed that requirement, stating that laïcité "imposes that all men are given, without distinction of class, origin or denomination, the means to be themselves, to have the freedom of choice, to be responsible for their own maturity and masters of their destiny." In sum, the GOdF would admit atheists, while the lodges in the Anglo-American tradition would not. The United Grand Lodge of England then withdrew its recognition, and declared the GOdF to be "irregular." As other jurisdictions tended to follow the lead of either GOdF or UGLE, the schism widened.

Background on the belief in Deity 
There is some debate about when Anglo-American Freemasonry began requiring a belief in Deity. It may have dated from the earliest days of Freemasonry: the Regius Manuscript, the oldest known Masonic document dating from 1425–50, states that a Mason "must love well God and holy church always." James Anderson's 1723 Constitutions state that "A Mason is oblig'd by his Tenure, to obey the moral Law, and if he rightly understands the Art, he will never be a stupid Atheist, nor an irreligious Libertine." 

The GOdF required belief in God from 1849 until 1877, and then reversed its position.

The difference was not limited to the requirement in belief. Following the 1877 changes, the Grand Orient also removed all references to the Grand Architect of the Universe from its rite, and removed the Volume of the Sacred Law (which in France was the Bible) from its ritual. These elements had been present in French freemasonry before 1849.

Political discussion in the lodges 
Another difference between Continental and Anglo-American Freemasonry is that political discussion is allowed in Lodges following the Continental tradition, while it is strictly banned in the Anglo-American tradition.

Relationship with the Catholic Church 
Continental Freemasonry has been concentrated in traditionally Catholic countries and has been seen by Catholic critics as an outlet for anti-Catholic disaffection. Many particularly anti-clerical regimes in traditionally Catholic countries were perceived as having strong Masonic connections.

The 1913 Catholic Encyclopedia credited Freemasonry for the French Revolution and its persecution of the Church, citing a claim made in a document from the Grand Orient de France. The Encyclopedia saw Freemasonry as the primary force of French anti-clericalism from 1877 onwards, again citing official documents of French Masonry to support its claim. According to one historian, Masonic hostility continued into the early twentieth century with the Affaire Des Fiches and, according to the old Catholic Encyclopedia, the 1905 French law on the Separation of the Churches and the State can be credited to the Grand Orient de France, based on Masonic documents.

In Italy, the Church linked the anticlerical and nationalist secret society, the Carbonari, to Freemasonry and blamed the anticlerical direction of Italian Unification, or Risorgimento, on Freemasonry.  Into the 1890s the Church would justify its calls for Catholics to avoid dealings with the Italian state with a reference to the state's supposed "Masonic" nature.

Mexican Freemasonry was also seen as following the pattern of Continental Freemasonry in other Latin-speaking countries, viewed as becoming more anti-clerical during the nineteenth century, particularly because they adopted the Scottish Rite degree system created by Albert Pike, which the Catholic Church saw as anti-clerical.   

Even as late as 2005, the president of Spain's Union of Catholic Professional Fraternities blamed the anti-clerical measures of the Socialist government on a "tremendous crusade by Masonry against the Church."  

Freemasons attached to the more mainstream branch of Freemasonry, affiliated with the United Grand Lodge of England and the 51 US Grand Lodges, have often claimed that the anticlericalism of the Continental Branch of Freemasonry is a "deviation" from proper Freemasonry.

Continental Freemasonry across the world 
Continental style Lodges exist in most regions of the world. Throughout Continental Europe, Latin America, most of the Caribbean and most of Africa, they are the predominant tradition of Freemasonry, while in the United States of America, the British Commonwealth, and those nations colonized by these powers they are virtually non-existent.

Latin America and the Caribbean 
Throughout Latin America and the Caribbean, both Continental and Anglo-American, conservative jurisdictions exist but Continental style Masonic Bodies predominate. In Brazil, for example, the largest and oldest Masonic body, the Grande Oriente do Brasil is recognised by Anglo-American jurisdictions. Nevertheless, when its membership numbers are compared to the members of all of the Continental style Masonic Bodies, it remains a minority.

In many Latin American countries, the Masonic split has mirrored political divisions. Rivalry between two factions in Mexican Freemasonry is said to have contributed to the Mexican civil war.

Continental Europe

France 
Continental style Freemasonry originated in France and its members make up the overwhelming majority of Freemasons in the nation.  The Grand Orient de France is the largest Masonic jurisdiction, with the Grande Loge de France (also within the Continental tradition) second in membership. The third largest Masonic body is the Anglo-American style Grande Loge Nationale Française.
The International Order of Freemasonry for Men and Women Le Droit Humain founded in 1893 has 32,000 members in more than 60 countries.

Other European countries 
Continental style Freemasonry is prevalent in most of the continent (as its name suggests), although there are smaller numbers of members following the Anglo-American tradition in those nations also. Liberal Continental Freemasonry is present in the majority in most European countries.  However, in Germanic states, Anglo-American and Swedish Rite traditions predominate.

North America 

Although some Continental style organizations exist in the United States of America, they are a tiny minority there and have substantially larger (but still minor) numbers in Canada. In Mexico, however, Continental Freemasonry dominates. These Grand Lodges, Grand Orients and Masonic Orders usually belong to international organizations such as CLIPSAS, SIMPA, CIMAS, COMAM, GLUA, TRACIA and others.

Within the United States of America there are scattered Masonic Orders and Grand Lodges, such as the George Washington Union (GWU), the Omega Grand Lodge of the State of New York, and Le Droit Humain, that belong to the Continental or Progressive Universal Tradition. The Women's Grand Lodge Of Belgium (GLFB or WGLB), and the Feminine Grand Lodge of France also have liberal lodges in North America.

Africa 
Continental Freemasonry holds the majority in some nations, especially in French and Portuguese speaking areas (but is minority in English speaking areas).  It tends to originate from the French, Portuguese and Belgian former colonists.  African leaders such as Pascal Lissouba of the Republic of the Congo belong to Masonic lodges allied with Continental Freemasonry.

References

External links 
 Grand Orient de France Website 
 The International Order of Freemasonry for Men and Women, Le Droit Humain

Freemasonry
Freemasonry in France
Freemasonry in Italy